is a former Japanese football player.

Club statistics

References

External links

1984 births
Living people
Sakushin Gakuin University alumni
Association football people from Tochigi Prefecture
Japanese footballers
J2 League players
Japan Football League players
Tochigi SC players
FB Gulbene players
Górnik Łęczna players
Japanese expatriate footballers
Expatriate footballers in Latvia
Japanese expatriate sportspeople in Latvia
Expatriate footballers in Poland
Association football defenders